Achena Atithi ( Unknown guest) is a 1997 film directed by Ashim Samanta and produced by Shakti Samanta.
The film stars Sharad Kapoor, Suman Ranganathan and Rohit Roy in the lead roles. It was simultaneously shot in Hindi as Ankhon Mein Tum Ho. The film revolves around the frustrated love story of Prem Kapoor (Rohit Roy) and Pooja (Suman Ranganathan), because she is destined to kill her beau according to the stars.

Plot
This story is about Prem, Puja, Pratap and Ranjit. Prem loves Puja very much and wants to marry her. But Prem's family astrologer says that if Puja marries Prem, then Prem would meet with an untimely death. Prem's grandfather does not support the marriage. He tells Puja everything and orders her to leave Prem forever. Puja leaves Prem and marries Pratap. Pratap is a famous businessman and he loves Puja very much. Ranima, Pratap's mother is a patient of cardiac problems and dotes on Puja. During their honeymoon in Switzerland, Pratap dies in an accident. Puja doesn't reveal the news to Ranima. One day during Durga Puja, Puja suddenly sees Pratap who in reality is an impostor - Ranjit. Ranjit kills Ranima and when Puja sees the incident, she shoots at Ranjit, but unfortunately the bullet goes into Mamababu's chest and he succumbs. Ranjit calls the police and tells them that Puja has killed Ranima and Mamababu. The police arrest Puja. Prem fights the case for Puja and in court, Prem proves that Ranjit is the murderer. Then police arrest Ranjit, while Prem and Puja ring the wedding bells.

Cast
 Rohit Roy as Prem Kapoor
 Suman Ranganathan as Pooja
 Sharad Kapoor as Pratap / Ranjeet Burman
 Ashok Kumar as Kapoor
 Rakhee Gulzar as Ranimaa
Satyendra Kapoor as Public Prosecutor Gupta
Ram Mohan as Doctor
Pramod Muthu as Mohan
Ravishankar as Pooja's dad
Anuraag as Ramesh

Soundtrack

References

External links
 
 Achena Atithi on Gomolo

1997 films
Bengali-language Indian films
1990s Bengali-language films
Films directed by Ashim Samanta
Indian multilingual films